Derek Bermel (born 1967, in New York City) is an American composer, clarinetist and conductor whose music blends various facets of world music, funk and jazz with largely classical performing forces and musical vocabulary.  He is the recipient of various awards including a Guggenheim Fellowship and the American Academy in Rome's Rome Prize awarded to artists for a year-long residency in Rome.

Life
Bermel earned his B.A. at Yale University and later studied at the University of Michigan, Ann Arbor with William Bolcom and William Albright.  He also studied with Louis Andriessen in Amsterdam and Henri Dutilleux at Tanglewood.  Later, his interest in a wide range of musical cultures sent him to Jerusalem to study ethnomusicology with André Hajdu, Bulgaria to investigate Thracian folk style with Nikola Iliev, Brazil to learn caxixi with Julio Góes, and to Ghana to study Lobi xylophone with Ngmen Baaru.

Bermel's output includes pieces for a variety of performing forces, including solo vocal songs, pieces for large and small chamber ensembles, and fourteen orchestral works.  Though the ensembles he writes for are largely classical, his voice as a composer has been heavily influenced by both his travels and his education in Western art and popular music.  His orchestral work A shout, a whisper, and a trace is a good example of this interplay, as it draws on Bermel's knowledge of the Thracian folk style and the work of fellow ethnomusicologist and classical composer Béla Bartók.  Moreover, the piece engages directly with the experience of living in an unfamiliar culture, drawing on Bartók's letters home from New York during the last five years of his life.  He first came into the national spotlight with works like Natural Selection, a series of animal portraits for baritone and ensemble, and Voices, a concerto for clarinet and orchestra which he wrote for himself to perform.  The piece was premiered by the American Composers Orchestra under the baton of the composer/conductor Tan Dun and has since been performed by many other ensembles and conductors, including the Los Angeles Philharmonic under the baton of composer/conductor John Adams.  Other important works include his "Migration Series," a piece for jazz band and orchestra that draws on impressions of Jacob Lawrence's set of 60 paintings by the same name depicting the mass movement of African-Americans from the South to the North at the beginning of the 20th century, and "Soul Garden," a viola solo accompanied by string quintet that utilizes quarter-tones and slides to emulate the vocal effects of a gospel singer.  "Soul Garden" in particular reflects what Richard Scheinen, jazz writer for the San Jose Mercury News, has called Bermel's preoccupation with "the human voice--or more generally, language and the yearning the communicate.".  This artistic concern is equally evident in lighter pieces such as "Language Instruction," a humorous work for clarinet, viola, cello, and piano in which the clarinet plays the role of the voice on a language tape and the other three instruments students with various degrees of aptitude for the task at hand.

Bermel is also an accomplished clarinetist and plays both classical repertoire and rock and funk, performing with groups such as his own TONK.   He also sings and plays keyboards and caxixi in the rock band Peace by Piece.  He has premiered and performed numerous pieces with large orchestras, including his own concerto Voices and John Adams Gnarly Buttons with the composer at the podium.

Besides his work as a composer and performer, Bermel is active as a teacher.  He founded and served as director of the New York Youth Symphony's Making Score workshop for young composers.  The workshop meets twice a month at the ASCAP to study orchestration and composition.  The group and has heard from guest lecturers such as Meredith Monk, Steve Reich, and John Corigliano and had pieces read by ensembles such as the American Composers Orchestra.  More recently, he has mentored both young composers and conductors at Carnegie Hall through the Weill Music Institute.  Bermel also conducts masterclasses at universities and music festivals such as the University of Michigan, University of Chicago, Yale University, Peabody Conservatory, Bowdoin, Tanglewood, and Aspen.

Bermel's music is published by Peer Music Classical in the United States and is distributed in Europe, Australia and New Zealand by Faber Music.

Bermel began a three-year residency with the American Composers Orchestra in Fall of 2006 and currently serves on the ACO board.  In 2009 Bermel began his three-year tenure as composer-in-residence with the Los Angeles Chamber Orchestra as well as his position as artist-in-residence at the Institute for Advanced Study in Princeton, New Jersey, where he currently lives and works.

Music

Chamber Works
Large chamber ensemble:

Canzonas Americanas (2010)
Swing Song (2009)
In Tangle (2005)
Three Rivers (2001)
Continental Divide (1996)
Hot Zone (1995)

Small chamber ensemble:

Intonations (2016), string quartet
Passing Through (2007), string quartet
Twin Trio (2005), flute, clarinet, and piano
Tied Shifts (2004), flute, clarinet, violin, cello, piano, and percussion
Language Instruction (2003), clarinet, violin, cello, and piano
Catcalls (2003), brass quintet
Soul Garden (2000), viola + 2 violins, viola, 2 cellos
Coming Together (1999), clarinet and cello
God's Trombones (1998), 3 trombones and percussion
Oct Up (1995), double string quartet
Wanderings (1994), flute, oboe, clarinet, horn, and bassoon
SchiZm (1994), clarinet/oboe and piano
String Quartet (1992), string quartet
Mulatash Stomp (1991), violin, clarinet, and piano
Sonata Humana (1991), clarinet and piano

Orchestral works
A Shout, A Whisper, and a Trace (2009)
Elixir (2006)
Migration Series (2006)
Slides (2003)
Tag Rag (2003)
The Ends (2002)
Thracian Echoes (2002)
Dust Dances (1994)

With a solo instrument or voice:

Mar de Setembro (2011), mezzo-soprano and chamber orchestra
Ritornello (2011), electric guitar concerto
The Good Life (2008), soprano, baritone, choir, and orchestra
Turning Variations (2006), piano concerto
The Sting (2001-2) - (narr, orch)
Voices (1997), clarinet concerto

Symphonic Band
Ides March (2005)

Choral Works
A Child's War (2005)
Kpanlongo (1993)
Pete Pete (1993)

Songs
Solo voice:

Nature Calls (1999), medium voice and piano
Cabaret Songs (1998), soprano and piano
See How She Moves (1997), solo medium voice
Three Songs on Poems by Wendy S. Walters (1993), medium voice and piano

With ensemble:

Cabaret Songs (2007), soprano, clarinet, percussion, double bass, dobro, and guitar
Natural Selection (2000), low voice and ensemble
At the End of the World (2000), high voice and orchestra
Old Songs for a New Man (1997), baritone soloist and trumpet, trombone, piano, percussion, violin, double bass

Solo Instrument
Fetch (2004), piano
Funk Studies (2004), piano
Kontraphunktus (2004), piano
Thracian Sketches (2003), clarinet
Meditation (1997), piano
Turning (1995), piano
Two Songs from Nandom (1993), organ
Theme and Absurdities (1993), clarinet
Dodecaphunk (1992), piano
Three Funk Studies (1991), piano

References

http://dworkincompany.com/site/artist/derek-bermel/

External links

Official website
Peermusic Classical: Derek Bermel Composer's Publisher and Bio
Derek Bermel management 
Discography 
Page at Faber Music Ltd (publishing agent for Europe, Australia & New Zealand)
Inspirations - Derek Bermel blog

1967 births
Living people
20th-century classical composers
21st-century classical composers
American male classical composers
American classical composers
Artists-in-Residence at the Institute for Advanced Study
Musicians from New Rochelle, New York
University of Michigan School of Music, Theatre & Dance alumni
21st-century American composers
20th-century American composers
Classical musicians from New York (state)
20th-century American male musicians
21st-century American male musicians